The Special Police Units (abbreviation: SPU) are the police tactical units of the Chinese People's Armed Police (PAP) at the provincial and municipal levels.  There is at least one of such unit in each Chinese province to offer their services when requested by the local police, or other law enforcement agencies such as the border police or railway patrol police and the people's police of the Ministry of Public Security (MPS).

History

Early years
With the rise of global terrorism and increasing incidence of local aircraft hijackings in the 80's, came a need for a tactical armed response group to respond to both such local and international crises. With approval from the People's Liberation Army (PLA), a select group of elite officers was chosen and organized into the Anti-hijack Special Police Group  (反劫机特种警察部队) on July 22, 1982, officially code-named Public Security Unit 722 (公安部警字722部队). They were officially inaugurated into the PLA in the capital of Beijing during a ceremony on the 28th.

The command of the unit was later transferred to the PAP in 1983, and renamed China People's Armed Police Special Police Force (中国人民武装警察部队特种警察大队), and they were to undertake new roles such as counter-terrorism and counter-riot. In accordance with the Ministry of Public Security and Public Security regulations, the unit was again renamed China People's Armed Police Special Police School (中国人民武装警察部队特种警察学校) in 1985. The unit went on a recruitment exercise and, took in its first batch of new cadets that September.

2000 onwards
In 2002, with Central Military Commission (CMC) approval the Special Police course was institutionalised into college studies of various disciplines. It was renamed People's Armed Police Special Police College, combining both combat and education roles.

Since its inauguration, the People's Armed Police has set up Special Police Units in 36 provinces nationwide.

Organisation
The original Special Police Unit was set up in Beijing, but the increasing incidence of armed criminal activity throughout the whole of China has emphasized a need for such units within the individual states. The various units all answer directly to the Central government and enforce the same laws, however similar to such units in the United States they can only react to incidents within their own local of jurisdictions or provinces to which they are assigned.

Selection and training
Members of the SPUs are carefully selected and specially trained. The Special Police College conducts nationwide recruitment once a year.

Students are selected from PAP soldiers and squad leaders with excellent performance. The pre-screening process involves a 3-month mentally and physically demanding assessment and selection, where some recruits will be seeded.

This is followed by a three-year study in one of the two major fields: Armed Reconnaissance and Special Warfare. Upon successful completion of these courses graduates are assigned to the regional and municipal SPUs as Second Lieutenant officers.

Only a small number of the most excellent graduates would be selected to join the college's operation unit.

Weapons and equipment
Due to their multiple roles of acting as a tactical armed response to armed criminals, counter-terrorism duties, and riot policing duties, the SPUs employ a wide array of weapons and equipment. Their access to advanced equipment varies from province to province, however if needed they can call for assistance from the national police tactical unit, or from the People's Liberation Army garrisons.

The unit is armed with a variety of domestically manufactured weapons such as QSZ-92 pistols, and if the situation calls for it, they also have access to assault rifles such as the QBZ-95 and the Norinco HP9 shotgun.

Uniform
The standard uniform of the SPUs is the same as that of the People's Armed Police (olive green), but they also use a variety of camouflage and tactical uniforms.

The standard uniform layout has the arm-patch sewn on the left arm. On the camouflage and tactical uniforms, The words "SPECIAL POLICE GRP" (Special Police Group) is embroidered above the left breast pocket as well.

Certain SPU's may have the SPU arm-patch sewn on the right arm instead, with the local Police arm-patch sewn on the left arm.

Special Police Units in the People's Republic of China
Though initially confined to the metropolitan cities, today virtually every city has a paramilitary tactical unit of its own. A variety of abbreviations and acronyms are used for these organizations, which operate at national, municipal, and provincial levels. Although the SPU moniker is used colloquially to refer to all such units in the PRC, some teams have been known to use the SWAT acronym instead. Both names/acronyms are interchangeable when referring to them in the English language as they are actually the same (The phrase "特警", is used in the PRC to refer to both SWAT and SPU and thus may cause confusion for English speakers who think of them as different units). The confusion is made worse when some units tend to officially adopt their nicknames. Well known police units include the Snow Leopard Commando Unit (SLCU) and Beijing SWAT team.

See also
Snow Leopard Commando Unit
Beijing SWAT

References 

Sinodefence article on the SPU
中国特警部队成长风采录 (The Growth and Glory of China's Special Police Unit)—Photo Gallery and brief history of the SPU. Accessed on October 27, 2006.

External links 
 Photo Gallery and article on the Special Police Units in China
 Special Police Units Trying Out New Uniforms
 Training campaign for special police held in Nanjing

Specialist law enforcement agencies of China
Law enforcement units
Units and formations of the People's Armed Police